Lythrodes is a genus of moths of the family Noctuidae. The genus was erected by John Bernhardt Smith in 1903.

Species
 Lythrodes radiatus Smith, 1903
 Lythrodes tripuncta Barnes & McDunnough, 1911
 Lythrodes venatus J. B. Smith, 1903 (alternative spelling Lythrodes venata)

References

Hadeninae